Vincenza Bono Parrino (born 1942) is an Italian retired teacher and politician. She served as the minister of cultural and environmental heritage in the cabinet led by Prime Minister Ciriaco De Mita in the period 1988–1989. She was a member of the Italian Democratic Socialist Party.

Biography
Bono Parrino was born in Alcamo on 29 October 1942. She is a literature and history teacher and high school administrator by profession. She worked as a city councilor in Alcamo. She was a member of the Italian Senate for two terms, legislatures X (1987–1992) and XI (1992–1994) representing Sicily for the Italian Democratic Socialist Party. She was elected to the Senate when her husband died while serving as a senator. During her term at the senate Bono Parrino was the president of the Italian Democratic Socialist Party being the first Italian woman to hold this post.

She was appointed minister of cultural and environmental heritage on 13 April 1988 to the cabinet headed by Ciriaco De Mita and held the post until 21 July 1989.

References

External links

20th-century Italian women politicians
21st-century Italian women
1942 births
Living people
Women government ministers of Italy
Culture ministers of Italy
Italian Democratic Socialist Party politicians
Senators of Legislature X of Italy
Senators of Legislature XI of Italy
People from Alcamo
Women members of the Senate of the Republic (Italy)